Jadu Tona is a 1977 Hindi horror film directed by Ravikant Nagaich. The film stars Feroz Khan and Reena Roy.

Plot
The story is inspired from the film The Exorcist. The movie Raat has also similarities with this movie.

Cast
Feroz Khan
Reena Roy

Music
"Aaine Kuch Toh Batta Unka Tih Hamraaz Hai Tuhi" - Yesudas
"Har Sannata Kuch Kehta Hai" - Asha Bhosle, Yesudas
"Yeh Gaon Pyara Pyara, Yeh Lovely Lovely Gaon" - Varsha Bhosle
"Atulit Bal Dhaamam Hey Sevak Shriram Ke" - Dilraj Kaur, Minoo Purushottam, Suman Kalyanpur, Hemant Kumar, Asha Bhosle, Brij Bhushan
"Sawari Saloni Jamna Ka Jeewan" - Yesudas, Asha Bhosle, Shivangi Kolhapure

References

External links

1977 films
1970s Hindi-language films
1977 horror films
Films scored by Uttam Singh
Films about spirit possession
Films directed by Ravikant Nagaich